is a Japanese given name. It means "future" and is part of the Sino-Japanese vocabulary (its cognates include Mandarin Chinese weilai and Korean mirae).

Coincidentally, it is also a Shona name meaning "wait".

People

, Japanese professional shogi player
, frontman of Sigh
, Japanese actor
,  American figure skater
Mirai Navrátil (born 1992), Czech (born in Japan) singer
, Japanese actress
, Japanese actress

Fiction
Mirai, a character in the Senran Kagura series.
, a main character in Maho Girls PreCure!
, initially named as Domon Junior (ドモンジュニア), Domon/Time Yellow's son, in Mirai Sentai Timeranger
Mirai Hibino, the main character in Ultraman Mebius
Mirai Iwaki, a character in Guru Guru Pon-chan
, a character in Gundam Build Fighters Try
, a character in The Idolmaster Million Live!
, a character in Beyond the Boundary, a character in Kiratto Pri Chan, a character in Tokyo Magnitude 8.0, the titular character in Mirai, a character in My Hero Academia, a character in the Naruto series
, a character in Dragon Ball Z and Dragon Ball Super
, a character in Mobile Suit Gundam, a character in Puella Magi Kazumi Magica''

Japanese unisex given names